Jifar may refer to:

Jifar (name), Ethiopian variant of the name Jafar
Jifar (village), settlement near Muscat, Oman